Francisco Leiva Ramírez (Málaga, 1630–1676) was a dramatist of the Spanish Golden Age.

1630 births
1676 deaths
Spanish dramatists and playwrights
Spanish male dramatists and playwrights